was a district located in Toyama Prefecture, Japan.

History
Due to the enforcement of the district government, the district was founded in 1896 when the former Tonami District, occupied the southwestern Etchū Province, split into Nishitonami and Higashitonami Districts.

At the time of founding, the district covered all of the city of Tonami (but the areas of Takanami, Takasu, and Wakabayashi); the city of Nanto (but the Kamiyamada and Yamada areas from the former town of Fukumitsu); and the area of Higashiishiguro and Nishinojiri from the former town of Fukumitsu; and the areas of Nakata and Toidewaka in the city of Takaoka. The district seat was located at the town of De (now the center of the city of Tonami).

District Timeline
 On November 1, 2004:
 the town of Shōgawa was merged with the expanded city of Tonami.
 the towns of Fukuno, Inami and Jōhana, and the villages of Inokuchi, Kamitaira, Taira and Toga, along with the town of Fukumitsu (from Nishitonami District) to create the city of Nanto, and Higashitonami District was dissolved as a result of this merger.

See also
 List of dissolved districts of Japan

References

Former districts of Toyama Prefecture